King Crimson Live at Summit Studios is a live album of radio session recordings by the band King Crimson, released by the Discipline Global Mobile label through the King Crimson Collectors' Club in February 2000. The album was recorded at Summit Studios in Denver, Colorado on 12 March 1972 during one of the band's American tours. The performance was notable for the absence of the band's trademark Mellotron, resulting in an unusual setlist and the inclusion of two lengthy collective improvisations.

The liner notes to Live at Summit Studios were written by drummer Ian Wallace, who discusses the Denver show and chronicles his involvement with King Crimson throughout 1971 and 1972. Wallace's track "My Hobby" is a brief comedy piece done in a Monty Python style.

The album was later re-released in high resolution and surround sound on an audio DVD with the 40th Anniversary Edition of the live album Earthbound.

Track listing
"Pictures of a City" (Robert Fripp, Peter Sinfield) – 9:38
"Cadence and Cascade" (Fripp, Sinfield) – 4:46
"Groon" (Fripp) – 13:49
"21st Century Schizoid Man" (Fripp, Greg Lake, Ian McDonald, Michael Giles, Sinfield) – 10:10
"Summit Going On" (Fripp, Mel Collins, Boz Burrell, Ian Wallace) – 11:39
"My Hobby" (Wallace) – 1:31
"Sailor's Tale" (Fripp) – 6:52
"The Creator Has a Master Plan" (Pharoah Sanders, Leon Thomas), including "Summit and Something Else" (Fripp, Collins, Burrell, Wallace) – 15:26

Personnel
Mel Collins – saxophone, flute, Mellotron
Robert Fripp – guitar, Mellotron
Boz Burrell – bass guitar, vocals
Ian Wallace – drums, backing vocals

Produced by Robert Fripp and David Singleton.

References

External links 
 King Crimson - Live at Summit Studios, Denver (March 12, 1972) (rel. 2002) album credits & user reviews at ProgArchives.com

2000 live albums
King Crimson Collector's Club albums